"Gone Away" is a song by American punk rock band the Offspring. Written by the band's singer, Dexter Holland, it is the seventh track on the band's fourth studio album, Ixnay on the Hombre (1997), and was released as its second single. It also appears as the sixth track on Greatest Hits (2005). A piano version of the song features as the eleventh track on the group's tenth studio album Let The Bad Times Roll (2021). 

The song became the Offspring's first No. 1 on the Hot Mainstream Rock Tracks, while reaching No. 4 on the Hot Modern Rock Tracks chart. Through 2009, the band played "Gone Away" with Holland performing on piano throughout Europe and the United States. Two of the tracks from this single ("D.U.I." and "Hey Joe") appear on the band's 2010 compilation album, Happy Hour!.

Track listing

CD single

7" black vinyl

Promo CD

Sales

The single reached Gold in Australia, selling 35,000 copies.

Music video
The music video, shot in grainy quality, was directed by Nigel Dick and was filmed on February 11, 1997 at the Morrell Meat Building in Los Angeles.  It shows the band playing in a dark, and apparently abandoned slaughterhouse. Dexter Holland, for most of the video, sings to a shining hanging light bulb. He is the only band member to interact with this bulb, though other lightbulbs are shown in each band member's respective rooms. Dexter also sings into a suspended microphone which is also used in the video; it swings back and forth as the video fades to black.

DVD appearances

The music video appears on the Complete Music Video Collection DVD, released in 2005. The DVD also contains a storyboard version of the video (with the storyboard playing over top the music video).

Rock Band
The song was made available as downloadable content in the Rock Band series on October 7, 2008. It appeared in the first Offspring pack along with "Pretty Fly (for a White Guy)" and "Self Esteem".

Charts

Weekly charts

Year-end charts

Certifications

Notable cover versions
Five Finger Death Punch covered the song on their 2017 compilation album, A Decade of Destruction, and on their 2018 studio album, And Justice for None. Their version peaked at No. 2 on Billboards Mainstream Rock Airplay chart in April 2018.
Midwife covered a version of the song named 2020 on her 2021 studio album, Luminol, which borrows the same chords and mainly consists of the chorus of the song.

References

External links

The Offspring songs
1997 singles
1990s ballads
Music videos directed by Nigel Dick
Rock ballads
Songs written by Dexter Holland
1997 songs
Epitaph Records singles
Columbia Records singles
Songs about death